The Leeward Islands women's cricket team is the women's cricket team representing the member countries of the Leeward Islands Cricket Association: Antigua and Barbuda, Saint Kitts, Nevis, Anguilla, Montserrat, British Virgin Islands, US Virgin Islands and Sint Maarten. They compete in the Women's Super50 Cup and the Twenty20 Blaze, which they joined in 2016.

History
The Leeward Islands joined the West Indies domestic structure in 2016, playing in the Regional Women's Championship and the Regional Women's Twenty20 Championship. They finished bottom of their group in both competitions.

The side have competed in every 50-over and T20 competition since, but have yet to win a match, finishing bottom of the league every season.

In 2019, Leeward Islands captain Shawnisha Hector became the first Antiguan female cricketer to play for the West Indies.

Players

Current squad
Based on squad announced for the 2022 season. Players in bold have international caps.

Notable players
Players who have played for the Leeward Islands and played internationally are listed below, in order of first international appearance (given in brackets):

 Shebani Bhaskar (2019)
 Shawnisha Hector (2019)

See also
 Leeward Islands cricket team

References

Women's cricket in Antigua and Barbuda
Women's cricket in St Kitts and Nevis
Women's cricket in Anguilla
Women's cricket in the British Virgin Islands
Women's cricket in Montserrat
Women's cricket in the United States Virgin Islands
Women's cricket in the Leeward Islands
Women's cricket teams in the West Indies